Bangladesh Sweden Polytechnic Institute or Swedish as it is commonly known, is a government Diploma Engineering College located in Kaptai, Rangamati Hill Tracts in Bangladesh.

History
The institute was founded as "Swedish-Pakistan Institute of Technology" in 1963 with assistance from the Swedish government and main gate design by Uttam Das.

Academics

Departments

There are six departments in this college:
 Faculty of Civil Engineering
 Department of Construction Engineering
 Department of Civil (Wood Specialised) Engineering
 Faculty of Mechanical Engineering
  Department of Mechanical Engineering
 Department of Automobile Engineering
 Faculty of Electrical and Electronic Engineering
 Department of Electrical Engineering
 Department of Computer Engineering

Diploma courses

Admission eligibility 
SSC / equivalent pass????

Affiliation 
Bangladesh Sweden Polytechnic Institute is a Public technical education institute run by the Bangladesh Technical Education Board under the Government of the People's Republic of Bangladesh.

Hostel

There are three hostels:
Girl's Hostel
Swedish Hostel (Boys)
Jahangir Hostel (Boys)

See also 
 Bangladesh Technical Education Board
 Daffodil Polytechnic Institute
 Dhaka Polytechnic Institute
 Chittagong Polytechnic Institute
 Shyamoli Ideal Polytechnic Institute

References

External links
Official website
BSPI Alumni

1963 establishments in East Pakistan
Colleges in Dhaka District
Educational institutions established in 1963
Engineering universities and colleges in Bangladesh
Polytechnic institutes in Bangladesh